First presented at the Motor Show in São Paulo, 1990, the Aurora 122 C took three years and three million dollars in its development. With lines inspired by the Ferrari F40, the vehicle, developed by Aurora Projetos Automobilísticos, in Valinhos (SP) uses their own chassis and engine based on the central family 2 alcohol General Motors with a capacity increased from 2.0 to 2.2 liters and using a Garrett brand turbocharger, which guarantees a power output of 215 hp.

External links
 Lexicar Brasil. Aurora (in Portuguese)

Cars of Brazil